Ana Álvarez Wagener (born 1962) is a Spanish actress. She has appeared in such films as The Sleeping Voice, My Prison Yard, Biutiful, and The Invisible Guest. Her television credits include the role of Vicenta Ramírez in La Señora and its successor 14 de abril. La República.

Wagener graduated from the Escuela Superior de Arte Dramático de Sevilla. At the age of 18, Alfonso Zurro chose her for a performance in the opera Carmen, signing her up for the theatre company La Jácara in 1982.

She began her career as an actress in the theatre, and soon her face became known when she participated in television productions, such as Querido maestro, Compañeros, El comisario or La Señora.

She also works in dubbing since the 1980s, where her work stood out as a director and as an actress, usually dubbing the actress Felicity Huffman.

The seventh art reached out to her in 2000 with Achero Mañas' El Bola, and since then her film career has only grown. For instance, 7 Virgins, DarkBlueAlmostBlack, Take the Sky, My Prison Yard, Biutiful and The Sleeping Voice are other films in which she has participated. These last three films have earned her nominations for the Goya Awards, and she received an award in 2011 for La voz dormida.

External links

Ana Wagener on Facebook

References 

21st-century Spanish actresses
Living people
1962 births
People from Las Palmas